Raz may refer to:

Places

France
Pointe du Raz, the western point of the commune of Plogoff, Finistère, France
Alderney Race (Raz Blanchard), a strong tidal current between La Hague and Alderney
Raz de Sein, a stretch of water located between the Ile de Sein and the Pointe du Raz in Finistère in the Brittany region of France

Iran
 Raz, Iran, a city in North Khorasan Province, Iran
 Raz, Ardabil, a village in Ardabil Province, Iran
 Raz, Razavi Khorasan, a village in Razavi Khorasan Province, Iran
 Raz, Zanjan, a village in Zanjan Province, Iran
 Raz Galleh, a village in Kerman Province, Iran
 Raz Rural District, an administrative subdivision of North Khorasan Province, Iran
 Shiraz, a city in Iran

Other uses
 Raz (surname)
 Given name
 Raz Gal-Or, an Israeli businessperson in China
 Razputin, the protagonist of the video game Psychonauts
 RAZ, IATA airport code for Rawalakot Airport

See also 
 Raj (disambiguation)
 RAS (disambiguation)
 Raaz (disambiguation)
 Razz (disambiguation)
 Rez (disambiguation)